Komikoo is a monthly magazine in Malaysia that publishes high-quality comics from renowned Malaysian artists. Noradz Production Sdn. Bhd is the publisher of the Komikoo. Since its debut in 2008, Komikoo has partnered with different artists for its content, including Aadi Salman, Zafran, and artists from another monthly publication, Ujang. Each story in Komikoo is eight pages in length. In 2014, it was listed as a top competitor in the Indonesian comic marketplace.

List of Komikoo's Comics
 Komiko #0, the first comic, published in November 2007
 Komiko #1, published in January 2008
 Komiko #2, published in March 2008
 Komiko #3, published in June 2008
 Komiko #4, published in July 2008
 Komiko #5, published in August 2008
 Komiko #6, published in September 2008
 Komiko #7, published in November 2008
 Komiko #8, published in February 2009

External links
  Official site of Komikoo

References 

2008 establishments in Malaysia
Comic book publishing companies of Malaysia
Malaysian literature